"Come Sail Away" is a song by American progressive rock group Styx, written and sung by singer and songwriter Dennis DeYoung and featured on the band's seventh album The Grand Illusion (1977).  Upon its release as the lead single from the album, "Come Sail Away" peaked at #8 in January 1978 on the Billboard Hot 100, and helped The Grand Illusion achieve multi-platinum sales in 1978. It is one of the biggest hits of Styx's career.

Background and writing
Lyrically, the song uses sailing as a metaphor to achieve one's dreams. The lyrics touch on nostalgia of "childhood friends," escapism, and a religious thematic symbolized by "a gathering of angels" singing "a song of hope." The ending lyrics explain a transition from a sailing ship into a starship, by narrating that "they climbed aboard their starship and headed for the skies".

DeYoung revealed on In the Studio with Redbeard (which devoted an entire episode to the making of The Grand Illusion), that he was depressed when he wrote the track after Styx's first two A&M offerings, Equinox and Crystal Ball, sold fewer units than expected after the success of the single "Lady".

Musically, "Come Sail Away" combines a plaintive, ballad-like opening section (including piano and synthesizer interludes) with a bombastic, guitar-heavy second half. In the middle of the second half of the album version is a minute-long synthesizer-heavy instrumental break.

Come Sail Away is in the key of C major.

Personnel
Dennis DeYoung - lead vocals, piano, synthesizer
Tommy Shaw - lead guitar, backing vocals
James Young - rhythm guitar, synthesizer, backing vocals
Chuck Panozzo - bass 
John Panozzo - drums

Reception
Cash Box said that "a solitary voice introduces the melody to light piano accompaniment" and that then "the pure fury of the drum, guitar and vocal explosion that follows will pleasantly startle expectations." Record World said that "The melody here is most appealing; the message of escape seems just right for the spirit of the seventies."

Classic Rock critic Malcolm Dome rated "Come Sail Away" as Styx 7th greatest song, calling it "one of the all time great power ballads."

In the United States, "Come Sail Away" reached #8 on Billboard and spent two weeks at #9 on Cash Box. The song also peaked at #9 in Canada. On superstation WLS-AM in their home city of Chicago, the song spent two weeks at #3 and was ranked at #26 for the year.

Chart performance

Weekly charts

Year-end charts

In popular culture

Although the song hit its chart peak in 1978, "Come Sail Away" has had tremendous longevity in popular culture. It was arguably as popular in the 1980s (and in subsequent decades) as it was when released in the late 1970s.

Films
The song appears on trailers and TV spots for the films Atlantis: The Lost Empire, The Wild, and Big Daddy.

In the 2018 Netflix release Like Father the song is the choice of the main characters Rachel and Harry for their winning performance in the cruise karaoke championship.

In the 2019 film, Stuber,  the song is used during an action sequence later on in the film. It is referenced earlier in the film as well.

The song was used in the homecoming dance scene of The Virgin Suicides.

Television
The song appears as a plot point to the South Park episode "Cartman's Mom Is Still a Dirty Slut." If Eric Cartman hears any portion of the song, he feels a compulsion to sing the rest of it. On Chef Aid: The South Park Album, he does a cover of the song.

The song scored the end of the pilot episode of Freaks and Geeks, in which Sam Weir summons the courage to ask a popular girl to slow dance.  Though she agrees, the guitar-heavy second half kicks in before they can start slow dancing as originally intended.

A version of the song performed by Aimee Mann is used in the TV show Community in the Season 5 episode "Geothermal Escapism" for the nautical departure of Donald Glover's Troy Barnes.  In the first season, he'd confessed to crying upon hearing the original version of the song.

The song also appears in ER'''s season 7, episode 19 ("Sailing Away"), where Dr. Greene sings along.

In Generation Kill several of the Marines sing the chorus as they travel.

The song is parodied as "Please Say You'll Stay" in the Fish Hooks episode "Labor of Love".

The song was featured in The Goldbergs season 1, episode 2 ("Daddy Daughter Day"). The song again appears in season 5, episode 4 ("Revenge o' the Nerds"), sung by Erica Goldberg at a Revenge of the Nerds-style musical finale.

The song is performed by the New Directions on an episode of the television show  Glee (Season 6, Episode 11).

The song is performed as part of a Broadway musical in Mozart in the Jungle's first episode. Hailey plays the oboe section of the piece along with Cynthia at the cello. (Season 1, Episode 1)

In the Modern Family episode "Spring-a-Ding-Fling," a parody of the song is sung by realtor Phil Dunphy, played by Ty Burrell.

The song is performed by actress Olivia Holt in the season-one finale of Cloak & Dagger (episode 10).

The song was featured in the end credits of the Family Guy episode "Carny Knowledge".

Other
Me First and the Gimme Gimmes released a cover on their album Ruin Jonny's Bar Mitzvah, which was featured in commercials for season 3 of the Discovery Channel's Deadliest Catch in 2005.

Patty Pravo covered it as "Dai Sali Su" on her 1978 album Miss Italia''.

References

External links 
[ Song Review] at AllMusic
 

1977 singles
1978 singles
Rock ballads
Songs written by Dennis DeYoung
Styx (band) songs
A&M Records singles
1977 songs
1970s ballads